In Christian history, the Collegiants, also called Collegians, were an association, founded in 1619 among the Arminians and Anabaptists in Holland. They were so called because of their colleges (meetings) held the first Sunday of each month, at which everyone had the same liberty of expounding the scripture and praying.

History
Collegiants were an association, founded in 1619 among the Arminians and Anabaptists in Holland. The practice originated in 1619 when, after the Synod of Dort forced the States of Holland to dismiss clerics for encouraging refuge to individuals being persecuted for religious beliefs, three brothers of Warmond by the name of van der Kodde (or Codde)—Gijsbert, Jan Jacobsz, and Adriaen—decided to hold religious services of their own. The sect began as a refuge from the bitterness of the Calvinist and Arminian controversies of the day. Their name is derived from the custom they had of calling their communities "Colleges", as did Spener and the Pietists of Germany.

In Rijnsburg, the Collegiants had a guest-quarter in the present-day alleyway of Kwakelsteeg called the Grote Huis (Large House).

There were also large communities of Collegiants in other places, for instance in Amsterdam and Hoorn. The Amsterdam college was founded in 1646 by Adam Boreel as a spiritualist cell, like those of Sebastian Franck and Kaspar Schwenkfeld, but Daniel De Breen, a Leiden-educated Remonstrant theologian, brought the college in line with Rijinsburger principles. A disaffected Mennonite, Galenus Abrahamsz (or Abrahamson), brought many other Mennonites to the Amsterdam college. In Amsterdam, the Collegiants ran an orphanage, 'De Oranjeappel', where the Dutch writer Aagje Deken was raised.

Belief and practice
Their principle from the beginning had been to admit all individuals to their society who were willing to acknowledge their belief in the Bible as inspired scripture, and to take it as a guide for Christian life; but no confession of faith was used, and the widest diversity of opinion was permitted. Their form of worship consisted of prayer meetings held on Sundays and Wednesdays, at which any men of the community might pray and expound the scripture, but there was no regular organization of a ministry among them. They recognized the necessity of baptism, which they administered by immersion, and twice a year they had a sacramental meeting extending over several days, similar to those of the Scottish Presbyterians.

The Collegiants and Spinoza
Benedict Spinoza joined the study groups of the Collegiants while living near Leiden from 1660 to 1663. It was during this period that he began working on his major book, The Ethics. At the end of the 17th century, the opinions of Spinoza had obtained a strong hold upon the Collegiants, and caused a temporary division of their members into two parties, with separate places of meeting. The leader of the Spinozist party was John Bredenburg, a merchant of Rotterdam, and he was opposed by a bookseller from Amsterdam, named Francis Couper, who attained some eminence by a work which he wrote against Bredenburg under the title Arcana Atheismi detecta ("The Secrets of Atheism Revealed"); he was also the publisher of the Bibliotheca Fratrum Polonorum seu Unitariorum. The two parties were reunited on the death of these two controversialists, and attracted many to their society from other sects during the 18th century.

Final years as a religious group and ongoing legacy
The last (open) meetings of the Collegiants were held in Rijnsburg om 27 May 1787, in Rotterdam on 9 September 1788, and in Amsterdam in 1791. The last baptism in Rijnsburg was in 1801. The center in Rijnsburg was sold in 1828, after the last Collegiant had died. The orphanage of the Collegiants called 'De Oranjeappel' survives to this day as a foundation promoting youth work ("Stichting Weeshuis der Doopsgezinde Collegianten "De Oranjeappel").

See also
 The Light upon the Candlestick

Notes and references

Citations

Sources

Further reading

External links
 Stichting Weeshuis der Doopsgezinde Collegianten  "De Oranjeappel" 

Former Christian denominations
Calvinism in the Dutch Republic
1619 establishments in the Dutch Republic
Organizations established in 1619
Religious organizations established in the 1610s
Protestant denominations established in the 17th century
1828 disestablishments in the Netherlands
Organizations disestablished in 1828
Dutch Baptists
Arminian denominations
Christian pacifism